Princess Victoria of Saxe-Coburg-Saalfeld (Marie Louise Victoire; 17 August 1786 – 16 March 1861), later Princess of Leiningen and subsequently Duchess of Kent and Strathearn, was a German princess and the mother of Queen Victoria of the United Kingdom. As the widow of Charles, Prince of Leiningen (1763–1814), from 1814, she served as regent of the Principality during the minority of her son from her first marriage, Carl, until her second wedding in 1818 to Prince Edward, fourth son of King George III.

Early life 
Victoria was born in Coburg on 17 August 1786 in the Holy Roman Empire of the German Nation and was named Marie Louise Victoire. She was the fourth daughter and seventh child of Franz Frederick Anton, Duke of Saxe-Coburg-Saalfeld, and Countess Augusta of Reuss-Ebersdorf.
One of her brothers was Ernest I, Duke of Saxe-Coburg-Gotha, and another brother, Leopold, future king of the Belgians, married, in 1816, Princess Charlotte of Wales, the only legitimate daughter of the future King George IV, and heiress presumptive to the British throne.

Marriages

First marriage
On 21 December 1803 at Coburg, a young Victoria married (as his second wife) Charles, Prince of Leiningen (1763–1814), whose first wife, Countess Henrietta Sophie of Reuss-Ebersdorf (1767–1801), had been her aunt. The couple had two children, Prince Carl, born on 12 September 1804, and Princess Feodora of Leiningen, born on 7 December 1807.

Through her first marriage, she is a direct matrilineal ancestor to various members of royalty in Europe, including Carl XVI Gustaf of Sweden, Felipe VI of Spain, and Constantine II of Greece.

Regency
After the death of her first spouse, she served as regent of the Principality of Leiningen during the minority of their son, Carl.

Second marriage
The death of Princess Charlotte of Wales, the wife of Victoria's brother Leopold, in 1817, prompted a succession crisis. With Parliament offering them a financial incentive, three of Charlotte's uncles, sons of George III, were prepared to marry. One of them, Prince Edward, Duke of Kent and Strathearn (1767–1820) proposed to Victoria and she accepted. The couple were married on 29 May 1818 at Amorbach and on 11 July 1818 at Kew, a joint ceremony at which Edward's brother, the Duke of Clarence and St Andrews, later King William IV, married Adelaide of Saxe-Meiningen. Shortly after their marriage, the Kents moved to Germany, where the cost of living would be cheaper. Soon after, Victoria became pregnant, and the Duke and Duchess, determined to have their child born in England, raced back. Arriving at Dover on 23 April 1819, they moved into Kensington Palace, where Victoria gave birth to a daughter on 24 May 1819, Princess Alexandrina Victoria of Kent, later Queen Victoria. An efficient organiser, Sir John Conroy, ensured the Kents' speedy return to England in time for the birth of their first child.

Widowhood

The Duke of Kent died suddenly of pneumonia in January 1820, six days before his father, King George III. His widow the Duchess had little cause to remain in the United Kingdom, since she did not speak the language and had a palace at home in Coburg where she could live cheaply on the revenues of her first husband. However, the British succession at this time was far from assured – of the three brothers older than Edward, the new king, George IV, and the Duke of York were both estranged from their wives, who were in any case past childbearing age. The third brother, the Duke of Clarence, had yet to produce any surviving children with his wife. The Duchess of Kent decided that she would do better by gambling on her daughter's accession than by living quietly in Coburg and, having inherited her second husband's debts, sought support from the British government. After the death of Edward and his father, the young Princess Victoria was still only third in line for the throne, and Parliament was not inclined to support yet more impoverished royalty.

The provision made for the Duchess of Kent was mean: she resided in a suite of rooms in the dilapidated Kensington Palace, along with several other impoverished members of the royal family, and received little financial support from the Civil List, since Parliament had vivid memories of the late Duke's extravagance.  In practice, a main source of support for her was her brother, Leopold. The latter had a huge income of fifty thousand pounds per annum for life, representing an annuity allotted to him by the British Parliament on his marriage to Princess Charlotte, which had made him seem likely to become in due course the consort of the monarch. Even after Charlotte's death, Leopold's annuity was not revoked by Parliament.

In 1831, with George IV dead and the new king William IV (formerly the Duke of Clarence) being over 60 without any surviving legitimate issue, and whose nearly 40-year-old wife was considered to be at the end of childbearing age, the young princess's status as heir presumptive and the Duchess's prospective place as regent led to major increases in British state income for the Kents. Parliament agreed an annuity for the Duchess and her daughter in August 1831. A contributing factor was Leopold's designation as King of the Belgians, upon which he surrendered his British income.

Royal feud

Together in a hostile environment, John Conroy's relationship with the Duchess was very close, with him serving as her comptroller and private secretary for the next nineteen years, as well as holding the unofficial roles of public relations officer, counsellor, confidant and political agent. While it is not clear which of the two was more responsible for devising the Kensington System, it was created to govern young Victoria's upbringing. The intention was for the Duchess to be appointed regent upon Victoria's (assumed youthful) succession and for Conroy to be created Victoria's private secretary and given a peerage. The Duchess and Conroy continued to be unpopular with the royal family and, in 1829, the Duke of Cumberland spread rumours that they were lovers in an attempt to discredit them. The Duke of Clarence referred to Conroy as "King John", while the Duchess of Clarence wrote to the Duchess of Kent to advise that she was increasingly isolating herself from the royal family and that she must not grant Conroy too much power.

The Duchess of Kent was extremely protective, and raised Victoria largely isolated from other children under the so-called "Kensington System". The system prevented the princess from meeting people whom her mother and Conroy deemed undesirable (including most of her father's family), and was designed to render her weak and dependent upon them. The Duchess avoided the court because she was scandalised by the presence of King William's illegitimate children, and perhaps prompted the emergence of Victorian morality by insisting that her daughter avoid any appearance of sexual impropriety. Victoria shared a bedroom with her mother every night, studied with private tutors to a regular timetable, and spent her play-hours with her dolls and her King Charles Spaniel, Dash.

Perhaps because of Conroy's influence, the relationship between the Duchess's household and King William IV soon soured, with the Duchess regarding the King as an oversexed oaf. As far as she dared, the Duchess denied the King access to his niece. She prevented her daughter from attending William's coronation out of a disagreement of precedence, a decision attributed by the Duke of Wellington to Conroy. In 1831, the year of William's coronation, Conroy and the Duchess embarked on a series of royal tours with Victoria to expose her to the people and solidify their status as potential regents. Their efforts were ultimately successful and, in November 1831, it was declared that the Duchess would be sole regent in the event of Victoria's young queenship. The Duchess further offended the King by taking rooms in Kensington Palace that the King had reserved for himself, and she snubbed his illegitimate children, the FitzClarences, before and during his reign.

Both the King and Queen Adelaide were fond of their niece, but their attempts to forge a close relationship with the girl were frustrated by the conflict with the Duchess of Kent. The King, angered at what he took to be disrespect from the Duchess to his wife, took the opportunity at what proved to be his final birthday banquet in August 1836 to settle the score. Speaking to those assembled at the banquet, who included the Duchess and Princess Victoria, William expressed his hope that he would survive until Princess Victoria was 18 so that the Duchess of Kent would never be regent. He said,
I trust to God that my life may be spared for nine months longer ... I should then have the satisfaction of leaving the exercise of the Royal authority to the personal authority of that young lady, heiress presumptive to the Crown, and not in the hands of a person now near me, who is surrounded by evil advisers and is herself incompetent to act with propriety in the situation in which she would be placed.
The breach between the Duchess and the King and Queen was never fully healed, but Victoria always viewed both of them with kindness.

Conroy had high hopes for his patroness and himself: he envisaged Victoria succeeding the throne at a young age, thus needing a regency government, which, following the Regency Act 1830, would be headed by the princess's mother (who had already served in that capacity in Germany following the death of her first husband). As the personal secretary of the Duchess, Conroy would be the veritable "power behind the throne". He had not counted on William IV surviving long enough for Victoria to come of age and be able to succeed to the throne as an adult and consequently, while cultivating her mother, had shown little consideration for Victoria. When the latter succeeded, Conroy risked having no influence over her. He tried to force Victoria to agree to make him her personal secretary once she succeeded, but this plan, too, backfired.  Victoria resented her mother's support for Conroy's schemes and being pressured by her to sign a paper declaring Conroy her personal secretary. The result was that when Victoria became queen, she relegated the Duchess to separate accommodations, away from her own.

Reconciliation

When the Queen's first child, the Princess Royal, was born, the Duchess of Kent unexpectedly found herself welcomed back into Victoria's inner circle. It is likely that this came about as a result of the dismissal of Baroness Lehzen at the behest of Victoria's husband (and the Duchess's nephew), Prince Albert. Firstly, this removed Lehzen's influence, and Lehzen had long despised the Duchess and Conroy, suspecting them of an illicit affair. Secondly, it left the Queen wholly open to Albert's influence, and he likely prevailed upon her to reconcile with her mother. Thirdly, Conroy by now lived in exile on the Continent and so his divisive influence was removed. The Duchess's finances, which had been left in shambles by Conroy, were restored thanks to Victoria and her advisors. By all accounts, the Duchess became a doting grandmother and was closer to her daughter than she ever had been.

Rumours of affairs

Some historians, including A. N. Wilson, suggested that Victoria's father could not have been the Duke of Kent. Those who promote this position point to the absence of porphyria in the British royal family among the descendants of Queen Victoria – it had been widespread before her; and haemophilia, unknown in either the Duke's or Duchess's family, had arisen among the best documented families in history.

In practice, this would have required the Duchess's lover to be haemophiliac – an extremely unlikely survival, given the poor state of medicine at the time, or the Duchess herself to be a carrier of haemophilia, since haemophilia is X-linked, meaning that her mother would have been a carrier, if haemophilia was not otherwise previously expressed in the Duchess's parents. Actual evidence to support this theory has not arisen, and haemophilia occurs spontaneously through mutation in at least 30% of cases.

John Röhl's book, Purple Secret, documents evidence of porphyria in Victoria, Princess Royal's daughter Charlotte, and her granddaughter, Feodora. It goes on to say that Prince William of Gloucester was diagnosed with porphyria shortly before he died in a flying accident.

Death

The Duchess died at 09:30 on 16 March 1861, aged 74 years, with her daughter Victoria at her side. The Queen was much affected by her mother's death. Through reading her mother's papers, Victoria discovered that her mother had loved her deeply; she was heart-broken, and blamed Conroy and Lehzen for "wickedly" estranging her from her mother. She is buried in the Duchess of Kent's Mausoleum at Frogmore, Windsor Home Park, near to the royal residence Windsor Castle.

Queen Victoria and Albert dedicated a window in the Royal Chapel of All Saints in Windsor Great Park to her memory.

Portrayal
Princess Victoria of Saxe-Coburg-Saalfeld was portrayed by Alison Leggatt in the ATV drama Edward the Seventh, by Penelope Wilton in the 2001 television serial Victoria and Albert, by Miranda Richardson in the 2009 film The Young Victoria, and by Catherine Flemming in the 2016 ITV series Victoria.

Ancestry

See also
Duchess of Kent's Annuity Act 1838

Notes

References

Bibliography
 Allen, W. Gore (1960). King William IV. London: Cresset Press
 
 
 
 
 
 
 Longford, Elizabeth (1964) Victoria R.I., London: Weidenfeld & Nicolson, 
 
  
 Marshall, Dorothy (1972) The Life and Times of Queen Victoria, London: Weidenfeld & Nicolson,  [1992 reprint]
 Packard, Gerrold (1973).  Victoria's Daughters.  New York: St. Martin's Press
 
 Somerset, Anne (1980). The Life and Times of William IV. London, Weidenfeld & Nicolson, .
 St Aubyn, Giles (1991) Queen Victoria: A Portrait, London: Sinclair-Stevenson, 
 
 Waller, Maureen (2006) Sovereign Ladies: The Six Reigning Queens of England, London: John Murray, 
 
 Woodham-Smith, Cecil (1972) Queen Victoria: Her Life and Times 1819–1861, London: Hamish Hamilton,

External links

1786 births
1861 deaths
People from Coburg
Wives of British princes
Duchesses of Kent
Princesses of Saxe-Coburg-Saalfeld
Hanoverian princesses by marriage
Princesses of Leiningen
House of Hanover
19th-century women rulers
Royal reburials
Daughters of monarchs